Loeblichella is a genus of foraminifera belonging to the family Globotruncanidae of the superfamily Globotruncanoidea and the suborder Globigerinina. Its type species is Loeblichella hessi. The genus was named and first described by Pessagno in 1967. Its fossil range is the Late Cretaceous Period.

Species
The genus Loeblichella contains four species:

 Loeblichella carteri
 Loeblichella coarctata
 Loeblichella convexa
 Loeblichella hessi

References

Foraminifera genera
Globigerinina